The County of Freiwaldau was a primarily ethnic German county in the Sudetenland areas of the former Czechoslovkia.  It was created in 1938 out of the political district of Freiwaldau, which had existed since 1850.  The County was changed on January 1, 1945 to the administrative district of Freiwaldau.

The county of Freiwaldau covered 736.36 km² with 68,823 inhabitants, of which 66,855 were Germans.  The population on December 1, 1930: was 71,717 inhabitants, on 17 May 1939: 70,005 inhabitants and on 22 May 1947: 36,302 inhabitants.

The County included:

 The cities of Freiwaldau, Friedeberg, Jauernig, Weidenau and Zuckmantel
 35 other municipalities.

References 
 Otakar Káňa. Historické proměny pohraničí: Vývoj pohraničních okresů Jeseník, Rýmařov, Bruntál a Krnov po roce 1945. Profil 1976.
 Josef Bartoš, Jindřich Schulz, Miloš Trapl: Historický místopis Moravy a Slezska v letech 1848-1960. Sv. 13, okresy : Bruntál, Jeseník, Krnov. Univerzita Palackého, Olomouc 1994. .

External links 
 Landkreis Freiwaldau Administrative history on the site: territorial.de (Rolf Jehke), as of 31. August 2013.

 County Friewaldau